Vitthal Umap (15 July 1931 – 27 November 2010) was an Indian folk singer, shahir and social worker from Maharashtra state. Umap was an Ambedkarite and Buddhist. To illustrate B. R. Ambedkar's philosophy to the people, he wrote the song-books "Mazi Vani Bhimacharani" and "Mazi Aai Bhimai".

He died while performing at a function in Deekshabhoomi, Nagpur on 27 November 2010. Umap, a follower of BR Ambedkar, collapsed while he was onstage at Nagpur’s famous Dikshabhoomi. He was rushed to a private nursing home where he was declared dead. Born in a Mumbai chawl in 1931, Umap struggled for recognition of the neglected folk genres of Maharashtra. He had toured extensively all over the state to keep alive the folk traditions.

Umap had won the first prize at the International Folk Music and Art Festival at Cork, Ireland. His roles in Shyam Benegal’s TV series Bharat Ek Khoj and Jabbar Patel’s film Dr. Babasaheb Ambedkar won him further laurels. He was nominated for the best actor's award for his performance in a Marathi film Tingya two years ago.

He composed music for several films, serials and dramas. He was also a part of popular stage shows Khandobacha Lagin, Gadhwacha Lagna, Jambhool Akhyan and Me Marathi.

After years of wait, Umap was recently given a house under the artistes’ quota.

At a cultural programme three months ago, a frustrated Umap declared that he was fed up with making innumerable requests to the government. "I don’t think I will get a house in my lifetime," he had said.

Then chief minister Ashok Chavan had earlier sanctioned plush houses to many artistes — several of them lower in stature than Umap.

Then deputy chief minister Chhagan Bhujbal, who was present at the show, vowed that he would get the singer a flat and fulfilled his promise within a fortnight.

Awards

Sangeet Natak Akademi Puraskar : Delhi Govt. 2010
MATA Purskar for Best actor for Jam bhul Akhyan.
Republican Party of India on the occasion of Dr.Baba saheb Centenary year awarded "Kalawant Puraskar".
From akhil bahartiya magazine "ladath Puraskar"1995-96.
Maharastra sashan sanskritik puraskar1996.
Shri Sarswati Jondhale Smruti 2000 Lok Vangmay Puraskar.

References

External links 
http://timesofindia.indiatimes.com/topic/article/04Cmg0q25f9JQ
http://theindustrymeasure.com/2010/11/27/marathi-folk-artist-vitthal-umap-collapes-dies/
http://www.indianexpress.com/news/lahuji-vastad-award-for-singer-umap/599649/
http://vitthalumap.com/#

Indian male folk singers
1931 births
2010 deaths
Singers from Mumbai
20th-century Indian singers
20th-century Indian male singers
20th-century Buddhists
21st-century Buddhists
Social workers from Maharashtra
Converts to Buddhism from Hinduism
Indian Buddhists